The 1984–85 Michigan Wolverines men's basketball team represented the University of Michigan in intercollegiate college basketball during the 1984–85 season. The team played its home games in the Crisler Arena in Ann Arbor, Michigan, and was a member of the Big Ten Conference.  Under the direction of head coach Bill Frieder, the team won the Big Ten Conference by a four game margin.  The team earned the number one seed in the 1985 NCAA Division I men's basketball tournament where it advanced one round before losing. Although the team began the season unranked it was in the Associated Press Top Twenty Poll a total of twelve of the seventeen weeks, including a peak of number two where it ended the season, and it also ended the season ranked number two in the  final UPI Coaches' Poll. During the season, the team led the Big Ten Conference in scoring margin (8.8) and Roy Tarpley led the conference in rebound with a 9.9 average in conference games.  Leslie Rockymore and Butch Wade served as team captains and Tarpley earned team MVP.  Tarpley earned 1985 NCAA All-American recognition.

For the first of five consecutive seasons, the team set the school record for single-season field goal percentage with a 51.3% (941-for-1834) performance. Antoine Joubert's single-season total of 164 assists established a school record that would be eclipsed the following season by Gary Grant. It surpassed Eric Turner's 160 total set in 1983.   Grant had 7 steals on January 19, 1985, against Iowa, which tied Rickey Green and Turner for the best single-game totals in school history. Roy Tarpley surpassed his school single-season blocked shots average record of 2.09 set the prior season with an average of 2.20. He would rebreak this record the following season. On February 7, 1985, against Purdue, Tarpley totaled 7 blocks in a game to earn the school single-game record that he would rebreak ten months later.

On January 12, 1985, the team began a 17-game winning streak against the Purdue that continued through a March 15 victory over Fairleigh Dickinson in the NCAA tournament. This is tied as the longest winning streak in school history (With the 2018-19 season), surpassing the January 29, 1921 – January 6, 1922 14-game streak. On January 5, 1985, the team began a 24-game home winning streak against Ohio State that continued through a February 15, 1986, victory over Iowa. This stands as the longest home winning streak in school history, surpassing the 22-game January 12, 1976 – November 30, 1977, streak. The streak ended with a February 20, 1986 74–59 loss to Michigan State. This stands as the longest road winning streak in school history, surpassing two 7-game streaks that ended in 1921.

In the 64-team NCAA Division I men's basketball tournament, number one seeded Michigan advanced one round by defeating Fairleigh Dickinson 59–55. In the second round the team was upset by eight-seeded Villanova 59–55.  The team was led in scoring and rebounds by Tarpley in both NCAA tournament games.

Schedule and results

|-
!colspan=9 style=| Regular Season

|-
!colspan=9 style=| NCAA Tournament

Rankings

Team players drafted into the NBA
Seven players from this team were selected in the NBA Draft.

See also
 NCAA men's Division I tournament bids by school
 NCAA men's Division I tournament bids by school and conference
 NCAA Division I men's basketball tournament all-time team records

References

Michigan
Michigan Wolverines men's basketball seasons
Michigan
Michigan Wolverines men's basketball
Michigan Wolverines men's basketball